Liezu is an imperial temple name for several Chinese monarchs. It may refer to:

Liu Bei (161–223), emperor of Shu Han
Cao Rui (died 239), emperor of Cao Wei
Murong Jun (319–360), emperor of Former Yan
Qifu Guoren (died 388), ruler of Western Qin
Murong Bao (355–398), emperor of Later Yan
Tufa Wugu (died 399), ruler of Southern Liang
Emperor Daowu of Northern Wei (371–409)
Yang Wo (886–908), ruler of Yang Wu
Li Bian (889–943), emperor of Southern Tang

See also
Liezong (disambiguation)

Temple name disambiguation pages